Adelphomyia is a genus of crane fly in the family Limoniidae.

Species
A. acicularis Alexander, 1954
A. apoana Alexander, 1931
A. basilobula Alexander, 1968
A. biacus Alexander, 1954
A. breviramus Alexander, 1924
A. caesiella Alexander, 1929
A. carbonicolor Alexander, 1931
A. discalis Alexander, 1936
A. excelsa Alexander, 1928
A. ferocia Alexander, 1935
A. flavella Alexander, 1920
A. luzonensis Alexander, 1931
A. macrotrichiata Alexander, 1923
A. otiosa Alexander, 1968
A. paucisetosa Alexander, 1931
A. pilifer Alexander, 1919
A. platystyla Alexander, 1928
A. prionolaboides Alexander, 1934
A. punctum Meigen, 1818
A. rantaizana Alexander, 1929
A. reductana Alexander, 1941
A. saitamae Alexander, 1920
A. satsumicola Alexander, 1930
A. simplicistyla Alexander, 1940

References

Limoniidae
Tipuloidea genera